The 18th SS Mountain Police Regiment was initially named Mountain Police Regiment (Polizei-Gebirgsjäger-Regiment) when it was formed in 1942 from existing Order Police (Ordnungspolizei) units in order to secure the railwayline in the northern Caucasus (oil transports from Baku) - the withdrawal from this area made these plans obsolete. 
When all police battalions were merged into regiments in July 1942 the Mountain Police Regiment received Nr. 18 out of a  total of 28 regiments. It remained the only mountain police regiment of the Ordnungspolizei.

Formation and organization
The regiment was ordered formed in July 1942 in Garmisch-Partenkirchen, Germany. Mountain Police Battalion 302 (Polizei-Gebirgsjäger-Batallion 302), Mountain Police Battalion 312 and Mountain Police Battalion 325 were redesignated as the regiment's first through third  battalions, respectively. The regiment was transferred to Slovenia shortly after formation. Colonel of the police  Hermann Franz became the first regimental commander and remained in command until August 1943 when he was relieved by Lieutenant Colonel (Oberstleutenant der Polizei) Hösl.
 
All of the police regiments were redesignated as SS police units on 24 February 1943, but this was only a nominal (honorary) renaming, all regiments remained part of the Order Police, they were not subordinated to the Waffen-SS oder SS-administration.
From 1943 - 1945 the Polizei-Gebirgsjäger Regiment 18 was subordinated to the Wehrmacht, first in Finland, in summer 1943 it was moved to Greece, in September 1944 it retreated north through the Balkans. While it was stationed in Greece, an artillery battalion was assigned to the regiment.

Notes

References
 Arico, Massimo. Ordnungspolizei: Encyclopedia of the German Police Battalions, Stockholm: Leandoer and Ekholm (2010). 
Muñoz, Antonio J. Hitler's Green Army: The German Order Police and Their European Auxiliaries, 1933–1945, Volume 2: Eastern Europe and the Balkans, Bayside, New York: Europa Books (2006) 
Tessin, Georg & Kannapin, Norbert. Waffen-SS under Ordnungspolizei im Kriegseinsatz 1939–1945: Ein Überlick anhand der Feldpostübersicht, Osnabrück, Germany: Biblio Verlag (2000). 
Yerger, Mark C. Allgemeine-SS: The Commands, Units and Leaders of the General SS, Atglen, Pennsylvania: Schiffer Publishing (1997) 

German occupation of Greece during World War II
Military units and formations of Germany in Yugoslavia in World War II